Alexis Trouillet (born 23 December 2000) is a French professional footballer who plays as a midfielder for Greek Super League club Panathinaikos.

Club career
A youth product of Rennes, Trouillet joined OGC Nice on 31 January 2020. He made his professional debut with Nice in a Ligue 1 match against Strasbourg on 29 August 2020.

On 30 August 2021, he moved to Auxerre on a season-long loan.

References

External links
 
 
 OGC Nice Profile

2000 births
Living people
People from Saint-Priest-en-Jarez
French footballers
French expatriate footballers
France youth international footballers
Association football midfielders
Stade Rennais F.C. players
OGC Nice players
AJ Auxerre players
Panathinaikos F.C. players
Ligue 1 players
Ligue 2 players
Super League Greece players
Championnat National 2 players
Championnat National 3 players
French expatriate sportspeople in Greece
Expatriate footballers in Greece
Sportspeople from Loire (department)
Footballers from Auvergne-Rhône-Alpes